The Manhattan–Junction City Combined Statistical Area, as defined by the United States Census Bureau, is an area consisting of three counties in northeastern Kansas, anchored by the city of Manhattan. It was upgraded from a Micropolitan Statistical Area (μSA) to a Metropolitan Statistical Area (MSA) by the Office of Management and Budget on November 20, 2008. It was changed from a Metropolitan Statistical Area (MSA) to a Combined Statistical Area (CSA) by the Office of Management and Budget on February 28, 2013.

As of the 2010 census, the MSA had a population of 127,081.  As of July 1, 2014, the CSA had an estimated population of 134,804, making it the fourth largest urban area in Kansas.

Counties
Geary
Pottawatomie
Riley

Communities

Places with more than 50,000 inhabitants
Manhattan (Principal city) Pop: 52,281

Places with 1,000 to 25,000 inhabitants
Junction City Pop: 23,353
Fort Riley (census-designated place) Pop: 7,761
Wamego Pop: 4,372
St. Marys Pop: 2,627
Ogden Pop: 2,087
Grandview Plaza Pop: 1,560

Places with 500 to 1,000 inhabitants
Riley Pop: 939
Westmoreland Pop: 728
Onaga Pop: 702
St. George Pop: 639
Milford Pop: 530

Places with less than 500 inhabitants
Leonardville Pop: 449
Olsburg Pop: 219
Belvue Pop: 205
Emmett Pop: 191
Louisville Pop: 188
Randolph Pop: 163
Havensville Pop: 133
Wheaton Pop: 95

Unincorporated places
Ashland
Bala
Keats
Rocky Ford
Wreford
Zeandale

Demographics
As of the census of 2000, there were 108,999 people, 39,366 households, and 24,774 families residing within the MSA. The racial makeup of the MSA was 81.42% White, 9.73% African American, 0.65% Native American, 2.72% Asian, 0.20% Pacific Islander, 2.24% from other races, and 3.04% from two or more races. Hispanic or Latino of any race were 5.18% of the population.

The median income for a household in the MSA was $34,712, and the median income for a family was $43,374. Males had a median income of $28,055 versus $22,821 for females. The per capita income for the MSA was $16,778.

See also

Kansas census statistical areas

References

 

 
Riley County, Kansas
Geary County, Kansas
Pottawatomie County, Kansas
Metropolitan areas of Kansas